Harry Hughes (1926–2019) was an American politician.

Harry Hughes may also refer to:
 Harry Hughes (Australian footballer) (1876–1929), Australian footballer
 Harry Hughes (footballer, born 1929) (1929–2013), English former footballer
 Harry Hughes (director), British film director and screenwriter
 Harry W. Hughes (1887–1953), American football player, coach and college athletics administrator

See also
 Henry Hughes (disambiguation)
 Harold Hughes (1922–1996), Governor of Iowa